The whisk is a ballroom dance step used in the waltz and American style Viennese waltz. It is one of several ways to get into promenade position and is used to turn dancers around corners or change their direction on the dance floor. It can be performed after a reverse turn.

Basic whisk
As in most waltz steps, the body rises starting at the end of the second beat and lowers on the end of the third. There is a sway to the left from the man's point of view, starting on the second beat.

Leader (man)

Follower (lady)

Back whisk
The back whisk is a variation on the basic whisk. It is very similar to the basic whisk except that it progresses backward rather than forward.

Leader (man)

Follower (lady)

Left whisk
The left whisk is a Gold syllabus variation on the whisk. There are at least three versions of the left whisk. One begins in promenade position with the couple moving forward on the first beat. The second starts in closed position with the man moving  on the right foot. The third is a left whisk on the first beat.

Left whisk from promenade position
Leader (man)

Follower (lady)

References

External links
 Demonstration of basic whisk at BallroomDancers.com
  (back whisk in the first few seconds)
 

Waltz dance moves